Treptower Park is a railway station in the Alt-Treptow locality of Berlin. The station consists of two island platforms, enabling cross-platform interchange between lines running in the same direction. It is located next to the park of the same name.

Notable places nearby
Archenhold Observatory
Treptower Park
Soviet War Memorial (Treptower Park)

References

Berlin S-Bahn stations
Railway stations in Treptow-Köpenick
Railway stations in Germany opened in 1875
1875 establishments in Prussia